The 1964–65 Bulgarian Cup was the 25th season of the Bulgarian Cup (in this period the tournament was named Cup of the Soviet Army). CSKA Sofia won the competition, beating Levski Sofia 3–2 in the final at the Ovcha Kupel Stadium.

First round

|}

1Montana qualified by drawing lots.

Second round

|}

Quarter-finals

|}

Semi-finals

|}

Final

Details

References

1964-65
1964–65 domestic association football cups
Cup